The canton of Calais-Nord-Ouest is a former canton situated in the department of the Pas-de-Calais and in the Nord-Pas-de-Calais region of northern France. It was disbanded following the French canton reorganisation which came into effect in March 2015. It consisted of 9 communes, which joined the canton of Calais-1 in 2015. It had a total of 28,468 inhabitants (2012).

Geography 
The canton is organised around Calais in the arrondissement of Calais. The altitude varies from 0m (Calais) to 154m (Escalles) for an average altitude of 27m.

The canton comprised 9 communes:

Bonningues-lès-Calais
Calais (partly)
Coquelles
Escalles
Fréthun
Nielles-lès-Calais
Peuplingues
Saint-Tricat
Sangatte

See also 
Cantons of Pas-de-Calais 
Communes of Pas-de-Calais 
Arrondissements of the Pas-de-Calais department

References

Former cantons of Pas-de-Calais
Canton of Calais Nord Ouest
2015 disestablishments in France
States and territories disestablished in 2015